Maliattha melanesiensis is a moth of the family Noctuidae. It was described by Robinson in 1975. It is found on Fiji.

References

Moths described in 1975
Eustrotiinae